The 2020 Houston Baptist Huskies football team represented Houston Baptist University in the 2020–21 NCAA Division I FCS football season. The Huskies played four non-conference games in the fall of 2020 and opted out of the Southland Conference season played in the spring of 2021. Led by eighth-year head coach Vic Shealy, Houston Baptist compiled a record of 1–3. The team played home games at Husky Stadium in Houston.

Preseason

Preseason poll
The Southland Conference released their original preseason poll in July 2020. The Huskies were picked to finish ninth in the conference, prior to their schedule split from the rest of the league. In addition, five Huskies were chosen to the Preseason All-Southland Team

(*) These teams opted out of playing in the revised spring 2021 Southland schedule, and instead played as Independent in the fall of 2020.

Preseason All–Southland Teams

Offense

2nd Team
Dreshawn Minnieweather – Running Back, SR
Ben Ratzlaff – Wide Receiver, SR
Jerreth Sterns – Wide Receiver, JR
Blake Patterson – Punter, SR

Defense

2nd Team
Caleb Johnson – Linebacker, SR

Schedule
Houston Baptist had a game scheduled against Texas Southern, but was canceled due to the COVID-19 pandemic. On July 22, Houston Baptist announced that it had added a game against Louisiana Tech as a replacement for Texas Southern.

Game summaries

at North Texas

References

Houston Baptist
Houston Christian Huskies football seasons
Houston Baptist Huskies football